FC Palmira Odesa was a professional football club based in Odesa, Ukraine.

History 

The club was founded in 1999 under the name Chornomorets-Lasunia, then was simply called Lasunia. In 2003, for a short period the club was called Lasunia-Transservice before renaming themselves to Palmira.

The team completed in the Ukrainian Second League in the 2003–04 and 2004–05. Before the 2005–06 season the club withdrew their professional license.

Their matches were held at Spartak Stadium and their kit colors were dark blue and light blue.

League and cup history 

{|class="wikitable"
|-bgcolor="#efefef"
! Season
! Div.
! Pos.
! Pl.
! W
! D
! L
! GS
! GA
! P
!Domestic Cup
!colspan=2|Europe
!Notes
|- 	
|align=center|2003–04
|align=center|3rd "B"
|align=center|6
|align=center|30
|align=center|13
|align=center|2
|align=center|15
|align=center|34
|align=center|37
|align=center|41
|align=center|1/16 finals
|align=center|
|align=center|
|align=center|
|-
|align=center|2004–05
|align=center|3rd "B"
|align=center|5
|align=center|26
|align=center|12
|align=center|7
|align=center|7
|align=center|31
|align=center|25
|align=center|43
|align=center|1/32 finals
|align=center|
|align=center|
|align=center|
|}

References 

 
Defunct football clubs in Ukraine
Football clubs in Odesa
Association football clubs established in 1999
Association football clubs disestablished in 2005
1999 establishments in Ukraine
2005 disestablishments in Ukraine